Pilar Brabo Castells (28 February 1943 – 21 May 1993) was a Spanish politician from the Spanish Socialist Workers' Party, previously from the Spanish Communist Party. She served as member of the first  legislature of the Congress of Deputies, between 1977 and 1982. Also in 1989 she became director-general of the Spanish Civil defense, office she held until her death.

References

1943 births
1993 deaths
People from Madrid
Spanish women in politics
Members of the 1st Congress of Deputies (Spain)
Spanish Communist Party politicians
Spanish Socialist Workers' Party politicians
20th-century Spanish women